Ride a Wild Pony (also known as Born to Run) is a 1975 American-Australian family adventure film produced by Walt Disney Productions, directed by Don Chaffey and based on the novel A Sporting Proposition by James Aldridge.

Plot
Set in a small Australian town during the interwar period, the film follows the battle between two children, Scott, a poor farm boy, and Josie, the handicapped daughter of a wealthy ranch owner, for ownership of a horse that both children love. Scott requires a horse to ride seven miles to school today and his father buys an unbroken pony, which Scott names Taff. Josie yearns to ride again but, being afflicted with polio two years ago, must settle on the use of a cart and pony. Scott's pony disappears, while a pony is eventually selected for Josie from her father's herd. When Scott sees the horse, which Josie named Bo, performing in the pony and cart competition at the township fair, he recognizes it as his horse and attempts to take it away. The ensuing quarrel affects both the children as well as dividing the town. The children eventually become friends and, while the ownership issue is legally resolved, they agree on a way of sharing the pony between them.

Cast
Robert Bettles as Scott Pirie
Eva Griffith as Josie Ellison
Michael Craig as James Ellison
John Meillon as Charles Quayle
Alfred Bell as Angus Pirie 
Roy Haddrick as J.C. Strapp 
Peter Gwynne as Sgt. Collins
Melissa Jaffer as Mrs. Pirie
Lorraine Bayly as Mrs. Ellison 
Wendy Playfair as Mrs. Quayle
Kate Clarkson as Jeannie Quayle
Jessica Noad as Miss Elsie
Neva Carr Glyn as Miss Gwen
Gerry Duggan as Train Engineer

Production
Although based on an Australian story, the film was originally intended to be rewritten to fit an American setting. However, the producer, Jerome Courtland, determined that an Australian background would not detract from the film's potential for success in the US. As a result, the film was not only set in Australia, but employed a largely Australian-based cast.

Shooting began in October 1974 and mostly took place in the small town of Chiltern, Victoria. There was also some filming in the small country town of Bingara, New South Wales, where some of the cast and crew, including John Meillon, stayed at the Imperial Hotel for around 3 months. Several different Welsh mountain ponies were used in the film's production.

Reception
The film opened on Christmas Day, 1975 at the Fine Arts theatre in Los Angeles and grossed $9,000 in its first week.

In 1976, The New York Times criticized the film as a "fundamentally uneventful and somewhat padded story", while in 1987 in a review for the film's video release it wrote that the film "was well acted, by adults, youngsters and pony...a film that children – and their parents – should certainly enjoy."  Also in 1976, The Blade wrote that the film "combines an intelligent script, a generally excellent cast, and good production values in a film with broad appeal."  The Daily Collegian also praised the film, saying that it contained "a refreshing amount of realism, and an emotional subtelty that is unusual for a Disney film."

See also
 List of American films of 1975
Cinema of Australia

References

External links
 

Ride a Wild Pony at Oz Movies

1975 films
1970s adventure films
Australian adventure films
1970s English-language films
Films about horses
Films based on children's books
Films directed by Don Chaffey
Films scored by John Addison
Films set in Australia
Films shot in New South Wales
Films shot in Victoria (Australia)
Walt Disney Pictures films
American adventure films
1970s American films